Nittenau is a municipality  in the district of Schwandorf, in Bavaria, Germany. It is situated on the river Regen, 18 km southeast of Schwandorf, and 24 km northeast of Regensburg.

It is the "sister city" of Lake Zurich, Illinois.

People 
 Heribert Prantl (born 1953), journalist

References

Schwandorf (district)